Boris Jacobson (13 September 1937 – 10 February 2013) was a Swedish sailor. He competed in the Finn event at the 1964 Summer Olympics.

References

External links
 

1937 births
2013 deaths
Swedish male sailors (sport)
Olympic sailors of Sweden
Sailors at the 1964 Summer Olympics – Finn
Sportspeople from Uppsala
20th-century Swedish people
21st-century Swedish people